Karsten Klein (born 2 December 1977) is a German politician of the Free Democratic Party (FDP) who has been serving as a member of the Bundestag from the state of Bavaria since 2017.

Early life and education 
After graduating from high school in 1999, Klein studied business administration at the University of Würzburg.

Career
Before being elected to the state parliament, Klein was marketing and sales manager of an Aschaffenburg company. He was managing director of the research institution Zentrum für Telematik e. V. in 2014 and worked as a research consultant for EU projects at the University of Applied Sciences in Aschaffenburg from 2015 until he moved to the Bundestag. 

From 2008 to 2013 Klein served as a member of the State Parliament of Bavaria. During that time, he was a member of the Budget Committee and served as his parliamentary group's spokesperson on the state's budget. 

Klein became a member of the Bundestag after the 2017 German federal election. He is a member of the Budget Committee and the Audit Committee. In this capacity, he serves as his parliamentary group's rapporteur on the annual budgets of the Federal Ministry of Health and the Federal Ministry of Defence.

References

External links 

  
 Bundestag biography 
 

 

 

1977 births
Living people
People from Aschaffenburg
Members of the Bundestag for Bavaria
Members of the Bundestag 2021–2025
Members of the Bundestag 2017–2021
Members of the Bundestag for the Free Democratic Party (Germany)
University of Würzburg alumni